Liriomyza ptarmicae is a species of leaf miner flies in the family Agromyzidae.

References

Agromyzidae
Articles created by Qbugbot
Insects described in 1925